Vanessa terpsichore, the Chilean lady, is a butterfly of the family Nymphalidae. It is found in Chile.

References

Butterflies described in 1859
terpsichore
Nymphalidae of South America
Lepidoptera of Chile
Endemic fauna of Chile